Jeongjong of Goryeo (31 August 1018 – 24 June 1046) (r. 1034–1046) was the 10th ruler of the Goryeo dynasty of Korea.  He was the second son of Hyeonjong, and the younger brother of Deokjong. At the age of four in 1022, he was made Naesaryeong, a position of high rank, and designated the Prince of Pyongyang.

Jeongjong was greatly concerned with national defense, and began constructing fortresses along the northern border in the first year of his reign. In 1037, the country suffered an invasion from the northern Khitan tribes. In 1044, the Cheolli Jangseong was completed, an enormous wall across northern Korea. Jeongjong also concerned himself with the material support of the army, distributing state land to indigent soldiers in 1036.

Just before his death in 1046, Jeongjong established primogeniture as national law.

Family
Father: Hyeonjong of Goryeo (고려 현종)
Grandfather: Anjong of Goryeo (고려 안종)
Grandmother: Queen Heonjeong (헌정왕후)
Mother: Queen Wonseong (원성왕후 김씨)
Grandfather: Gim Eun-bu (김은부)
Grandmother: Grand Lady of Ansan County of the Incheon Yi clan (안산군대부인 이씨)
Consorts and their Respective Issue(s):
Queen Yongsin of the Danju Han clan (용신왕후 한씨; d. 1036)
Wang Hyeong (왕형)
Queen Yongui of the Danju Han clan (용의왕후 한씨)
Wang Bang, Prince Aesang (왕방 애상군)
Wang Gyeong, Marquess Nakrang (왕경 낙랑후)
Wang Gye, Marquess Gaeseong (왕개 개성후)
Queen Yongmok of the Buyeo Yi clan (용목왕후 이씨)
Princess Doae (도애공주)
Virtuous Consort Yongjeol of the Gyeongju Gim clan (용절덕비 김씨; d. 1102) – No issue.
Princess Yeonchang of the No clan (연창궁주 노씨; d. 1048) – No issue.

See also
List of Korean monarchs
List of Goryeo people
Jeongjong, 3rd Monarch of Goryeo

References

 

1018 births
1046 deaths
11th-century Korean monarchs
People from Kaesong